Pawlas is a Polish surname. Notable people with the surname include:

 Elżbieta Pawlas (born 1934), Polish fencer
 Zygmunt Pawlas (1930–2001), Polish fencer

Polish-language surnames